In type theory a typing environment (or typing context) represents the association between variable names and data types.

The judgement
 
is read as " has type  in context  ".

In statically typed programming languages these environments are used and maintained by typing rules to type check a given program or expression.

See also
 Type system

References

Data types
Program analysis
Type theory